William Briggs Hopson III (born October 10, 1965) is a Republican member of the Mississippi Senate, representing the 23rd District since 2008.

External links
Mississippi State Senate - W. Briggs Hopson III official government website
Project Vote Smart - Senator Briggs Hopson (MS) profile
Follow the Money - Briggs Hopson
2007 campaign contributions

Republican Party Mississippi state senators
1965 births
Living people
University of Mississippi alumni
Mississippi lawyers
21st-century American politicians